Mu'inud-Daulah, Mushirul-Mulk, Azamul-Umara, Arastu Jah, a man of Persian descent, was the Diwan or the Prime Minister of Hyderabad during the reign of Nizam Ali Khan (Asaf Jah II) from 1778 until his death in 1804.

Nawab Azim Ul Umra Arastu Jah was the only person outside of the Nizam's family on whom the title Jah was conferred. He never failed in his respect to the Nizam or presumed to act without first consulting his pleasure. Indeed, he sought to obtain his sanction for his every act in public life.

Hostage of the Marathas

In the Battle of Kharda, which took place on 11 March 1795, Nizam being defeated by the Marathas, he was obliged to make a disastrous peace. He was forced to cede territories including Daulatabad,  yielding an annual income of 15 lacs, and he pledged himself to liquidate the whole of the Maratha's claim amounting to 30 million rupees.

The prime minister was also given in hostage to the Marathas and was detained in Poona until June 1797, when he succeeded in getting the treaty cancelled. The sudden termination of Arastu Jah's administration by captivity at the Maratha court deprived his Highness's government of the service of an able minister. The situation of the affairs until his return from captivity was very critical. Raja Shan Rai Rayan was discharged from the duties of minister in the presence of Nizam Ali Khan from the time Arastu Jah went to Poona until his return to Hyderabad in July 1797.

Nawab Arastu Jah, during his captivity in Poona, obtained much influence with the Marathas, so that before his return and reappointment as a minister, which took place in July 1797, he obtained the restoration of the territories ceded by the Nizam after the Battle of Kharda, the abandonment of claims from Chauth on Bida, the recession of the fort of Daulatabad and the extension of all the pecuniary claims on the part of the Maratha.

One of the first acts of Arastu Jah on his return to Hyderabad and reinstatement in the ministry was to induce the Nizam to allow prince Mir Akbar Ali Khan Sikander Jah, Asaf Jah III to sign all public documents and sanads.

Legacy 
The locality Musheerabad is named after him. His tomb is a heritage site in danger.

In 1797, Safdar Ali Khan translated a Sanskrit language work, presumably Bhaskara II's Siddhanta Shiromani, into Persian as Zij-i Sarumani, dedicating it to Arastu Jah. The translation is now a lost work, and is known only from a mention in Khan's other work - Zij-i Safdari.

References

1804 deaths
Politicians from Hyderabad, India
Year of birth unknown
18th-century Indian politicians
Prime Ministers of Hyderabad State